Calabash, Lagenaria siceraria, is a vine grown for its fruit.

Calabash may also refer to:

Plants
Calabaza, a winter squash grown in the West Indies, tropical America, and the Philippines
Crescentia, the calabash trees native to North America
 Sweet Calabash, Passiflora maliformis, a passionfruit

Other
 Calabash (percussion), African percussion instrument made out of a calabash
 Calabash Music, a record label
 Calabash, North Carolina, a town in North Carolina and a way of preparing seafood
 Calabash Nebula, a nebula 1.4 light years long 5,000 light years from Earth
 Calabash Bay, a region in Saint Elizabeth Parish, Jamaica
 Calabash pipe, a style of smoking pipe
 USS Calabash (SP-108), a United States Navy patrol boat in commission in 1917